The Ministry of Transport (MoT) of Ghana was created in January 2009. The ministry is responsible for the infrastructural development and service delivery in Ghana's transport industry.

History of the Ministry
The ministry was formed from former agencies of two government ministries namely the Ministries of Roads and Highways and the Ministry of Transport and Communication in 2001 by the John Kufuor administration. After the merger, it was known as the Ministry of Roads and Transport. This name was changed in 2009 to the Ministry of Transport by the John Atta Mills administration. The purpose for the agency merger was to create an autonomous ministry that could effectively formulate and coordinate transport policies for the country.

Scope of the Ministry
Over ninety percent of Ghana's international trade depends on the country's sea ports namely the Tema Harbour in the Greater Accra Region and the Takoradi harbour in the Western region.  The ministry is responsible for the effective running of these trade entry points so that the economy of the country can develop. The activities of the ministry covers both the private and public sectors of Ghana's economy. The creation of favourable environment for investment into the country's transport industry is also a function of the ministry.

Minister for Transport
The head of the Ministry of Transport is the Minister of Transport. It is a political appointment made by the President of Ghana subject to approval from the Parliament of Ghana. The current sector minister is Kweku Ofori Asiamah. he took over from Dzifa Ativor in 2013.

See also
Transport in Ghana

References

Transport
2001 establishments in Ghana
Ghana, Transport
Ghana
Transport organisations based in Ghana